The 1986 Syracuse Orangemen football team represented Syracuse University during the 1986 NCAA Division I-A football season. The team was led by sixth-year head coach Dick MacPherson and played their home games in the Carrier Dome in Syracuse, New York. Syracuse finished with a 5–6 record and did not qualify for a bowl game.

Schedule

Sources:

Roster

References

Syracuse
Syracuse Orange football seasons
Syracuse Orangemen football